During World War II, Slovakia was a client state of Nazi Germany and a member of the Axis powers. It participated in the war against the Soviet Union and deported most of its Jewish population.

Slovak State foundation 

The desire for autonomy was one of the great causes for Slovaks in Czechoslovakia. Monsignor Jozef Tiso and nationalists of the Slovak People's Party pushed for Slovak independence and aligned themselves with the Nazi Party in Germany. On March 13, 1939, German Chancellor Adolf Hitler invited Tiso to Berlin. Hitler told Tiso that he would support him if he separated Slovakia from Czecho-Slovakia; otherwise, the Slovak lands would be divided between Hungary, Poland and the rest of Czecho-Slovakia. On March 14, 1939 Slovakia declared independence, calling itself the Slovak Republic. German troops soon occupied the Czech lands, and established the German Protectorate of Bohemia and Moravia there.

War with Hungary 

On November 2, 1938, the First Vienna Award transferred the territories of southern Slovakia and southern Ruthenia to Hungary. Hungary was granted an area of 11,927 km² with a population of 869,299. According to the 1941 Census, 86.5% of these were ethnic Hungarians. Hitler even promised to transfer all of Slovakia to Hungary in exchange for military support from Budapest in the war soon to be unleashed against the Soviet Union, but the Hungarians were reluctant to engage in warfare. Instead, they agreed to a territorial revision along ethnic separation lines.

Hungary recognized the Slovak Republic led by Tiso. In 1939, from March 23 to March 31, a border war was fought between Slovakia and Hungary. Although Slovakia had signed a "Protection Treaty" with Nazi Germany, Germany refused to help Slovakia, in direct violation of that treaty. The Slovak-Hungarian War (also called the "Little War") resulted in the Hungarian occupation of a narrow strip along the border which had previously been Slovak.

Invasion of Poland 

On September 1, 1939, Nazi Germany invaded Poland. Slovakia's Field Army Bernolák, consisting of three infantry divisions and a mobile group, participated in the invasion and was subordinate to Germany's Army Group South.

Second World War 

The Tripartite Pact (also called the Three-Power Pact, the Axis Pact, the Three-way Pact or the Tripartite Treaty), an agreement signed in Berlin on September 27, 1940, linked Germany, Italy and Japan as the Axis powers of World War II. On November 24, 1940, Slovakia also signed the Tripartite Pact. Hitler asked the newly formed Slovak Republic (independent from March 1939) to join the invasion of Poland.

War in the East 

Slovakia did not participate in the start of the Axis invasion of the Soviet Union, which began on June 22, 1941. Hitler and other Nazi leaders distrusted the Slovaks against participating in Eastern European campaigns because they were Slavs. Although Hitler did not ask for help from Slovakia, the Slovaks decided to send an expeditionary force.

The Slovak Army group attached to the 17th German Army attacked the Soviet 12th Army. Along with the 17th Aramta German and Hungarian army, the group directed the Slovak army deep into southern Russia. During the Battle of Uman (3 to 8 August 1941), a mechanized body of the Carpathian Group formed double wings encircling the 6th and 12th Soviet units. During this struggle, 20 Soviet divisions were destroyed or surrendered.

From 1942 to 1944 only the Slovak 1st Division was kept on the front line, fighting in the Caucasus area and later in southern Ukraine.

4,000 Slovak soldiers were casualties in the fighting on the Eastern Front. There was also a high rate of desertion, at first individuals but later large groups of soldiers disillusioned with the war.

Slovak National Uprising 

On August 29, 1944, the Slovak National Uprising broke out after German troops invaded Slovakia. The German occupation troops resumed the pursuit of the Final Solution by deporting Slovak Jews to mass death-camps in Germany and Poland.

Slovakia soon became a theater of war. On September 19, 1944, the German command replaced SS-Obergruppenführer Berger, who had previously commanded the troops fighting the Uprising, with SS-General Höfle. By that time the Germans had 48,000 soldiers in Slovakia: eight German divisions (including four of the Waffen-SS) and one pro-Nazi Slovak formation.

On October 1 the resistance army renamed itself as the "1st Czechoslovak Army in Slovakia" in order to symbolize the beginning of a Czech-Slovak reunification that the allied forces would recognize.

A major German counteroffensive began on October 17−18, 1944, when 35,000 German soldiers entered Slovakia from Hungary (which the German military had occupied on March 19, 1944). Stalin demanded that the advance of the 2nd Ukrainian Front led by General Rodion Malinovsky immediately divert towards Budapest. By the end of October 1944, the Axis forces (six German divisions and the pro-Nazi Slovak unit) took back most of the territory which the resistance army had occupied, and surrounded the battle groups. The fighting cost at least 10,000 casualties on both sides.

The resistance had to evacuate Banská Bystrica on October 27 just before the German takeover. SOE and OSS agents retreated to the mountains, with thousands of others fleeing the German advance. On October 28, General Viest, the commander of the 1st Czechoslovak Army in Slovakia, informed London that the resistance would move towards guerilla warfare. On October 30, General President Hoffa and Tiso celebrated in Banská Bystrica, with medals for German soldiers for their part in suppressing the revolt.

However, the remnants of the forces of the National Uprising continued their efforts in the mountains. In retaliation, the Germans executed several hundred suspected resistance members and Jews, and destroyed 93 villages for suspected collaboration. A later estimated death toll was 5,304; and the authorities have discovered 211 mass graves that resulted from these atrocities. Most executions took place in Kremnička and Nemecká. On 3 November the Germans captured Viest and Golian in Bukovec Pohronský; Nazi authorities later interrogated and executed the two captured commanders.

Special Operations Executive and Office of Strategic Services teams eventually joined and sent a message requesting immediate assistance. The Germans surrounded both groups from December 25 and they were captured. Some men were summarily executed. The Germans took the rest to Mauthausen-Gusen concentration camp, where they were tortured and executed.

The German victory in Slovakia only delayed the final fall of Tiso's pro-National Socialist regime. Six months later, the Red Army attacked the Axis forces in Slovakia. As early as December 1944, Romanian and Soviet troops confronted German troops in southern Slovakia as part of the Battle of Budapest (26 December to 13 February). On January 19, 1945, the Red Army occupied Bardejov, Svidník, Prešov and Košice in eastern Slovakia. On March 3–5 they took northwestern Slovakia. Soviet and Romanian troops liberated Banská Bystrica on 26 March 1945. Malinovsky's forces marched into Bratislava on 4 April 1945.

The Slovak National Uprising did not achieve its main military objectives due to the timing of the uprising and the actions of Soviet partisans, who often undermined the plans and objectives of the Slovak armed insurrection. If the uprising had occurred later, when Slovak preparations were complete, the Slovak resistance could theoretically have co-ordinated with the Allies and allowed the Red Army to move quickly through Slovakia (although it is questionable whether the Soviet leadership would have preferred such an option, as this would have significantly empowered democratic forces in Slovakia). Nevertheless, the activity of the guerrilla forces required Germany to deploy troops that could have otherwise strengthened the eastern front lines against the advancing fronts of Ukraine to the north and south of Slovakia.

Air warfare 
Slovakia became target of Allied bombers towards the end of World War II. The major targets of strategic bombing included oil refineries in Bratislava and Dubová (Banská Bystrica Region), arms factories in Dubnica nad Váhom and Považská Bystrica, railroad hubs like Nové Zámky. During the liberation months tactical bombing was executed, strongest hit were Prešov and Nitra.

Major air raid included the bombing of Bratislava and its refinery Apollo on June 16, 1944 by American B-24 bombers of the Fifteenth Air Force with 181 victims and bombing of Nitra on March 26, 1945 by Soviet A-20 bombers with 345 victims.

Deportations of Jews

Approximately 60,000 of the 95,000 Slovak Jews were deported by the Nazis and sent to death camps in German-occupied Poland before 1942. Then the Slovak government made a deal with Germany for the Jews to be "delivered" in exchange for workers needed for the Slovak Nazi war economy. After the Wannsee Conference of 20 January 1942 the Germans agreed with the Slovaks' proposal, and the two parties agreed that the Slovak Republic would pay a fixed amount for each Jew deported. In return, Germany promised that the Jews would never return to Slovakia.

Aftermath 

After signing the Peace Treaty of Paris, Slovakia lost its so-called independence and was reunified with the Czech Republic. Hungarian and Czechoslovak authorities (under Soviet influence) forced an exchange of population.

See also 
Croatian–Romanian–Slovak friendship proclamation

References

Sources

External links
 Slovakian Axis Forces in WWII